Rosco McGlashan (born 1950) OAM is an Australian drag racing record-holder, who currently holds the Australian land speed record at 500 mph (802.6 km/h).

Aussie Invader II 
McGlashan attempted to set the record in his jet-powered car, Aussie Invader II. The car was powered by a 36,000 hp Atar jet engine from a Mirage jet fighter aeroplane. In February 1995 Rosco and his team headed back to Lake Gairdner for an assault at the 633.468 mph (1,013.55 km/h) world land speed record, held by Richard Noble. This attempt was not a success, due to poor salt conditions, the course being very wet in places. McGlashan ran off course and hit the metal timing equipment at 960 km/h (600 mph). McGlashan walked away but the car was destroyed.

Aussie Invader III 
McGlashan then built his next car Aussie Invader III. With this car McGlashan hoped to challenge Andy Green and Craig Breedlove to be the first to Mach 1 on land, but again the salt conditions were too bad for high speed record runs. On 15 October 1997, Andy Green reached , the first supersonic record (Mach 1.016). In 2012, McGlashan sold the Aussie Invader III in order to raise money for the Aussie Invader 5R.

Aussie Invader 5R 
Needing a vehicle with more power, McGlashan has announced  that he has designed a new car, the Aussie Invader 5R. The rocket car will be his biggest and most powerful yet at 16 m (52 ft) in length and 3 metres (10 ft) high at the tailfin.

Construction on the car was started in 2009, and work on building Aussie Invader 5R is now in full swing, with preliminary planning and design work having taken a decade before the build could start.

The car has recently appeared at two Perth based motor shows after completion of phase 1 of the build (car rolling and systems in place). Phase 2 has started with further rocket motors and propellants being tested and then a smaller version of the selected engine design being constructed. Once this has passed the testing phase, then work will start on the full size motor (62,000 lb/f; 200,000 hp). This should propel the car from 0–1000 mph in around 20 seconds, burning about 3 tonnes of propellant over the full 1,000 mph run.

However, despite the evidence, this record is not recognized by Guinness, which has the record listed at 114.59 mph (184.41 kpm), less than half the speed of McGlashan's record.

See also
List of vehicle speed records
ThrustSSC Current record holder since 1997
North American Eagle Project aiming for 
Bloodhound SSC aiming for

References

External links
Aussie Invader official website
 Diagram of Aussie Invader 5R and how it works

Living people
Australian racing drivers
Dragster drivers
Land speed record people
1950 births
Recipients of the Medal of the Order of Australia